Fatma Bacı is a 1972 Turkish drama film, directed by Halit Refiğ and starring Yildiz Kenter, Fatma Belgen, and Leyla Kenter.

References

External links
Fatma Bacı at the Internet Movie Database

1972 films
Turkish drama films
1972 drama films
Films directed by Halit Refiğ
1970s Turkish-language films